Diptychophlia occata is a species of sea snail, a marine gastropod mollusk in the family Borsoniidae.

Description
The length of the shell attains 10 mm. The shell is light yellowish brown. The fusiform shell is slender and attenuated. The sculpture is angular from the ribs being continuous. The seven whorls are transversely ploughed. The suture is simple. The aperture is contracted, linear and a little oblique. The siphonal canal is of medium length.

Distribution
This marine species occurs off  Pacific Panama.

References

 Hinds, 1844. The Zoology of the voyage of H.M.S. Sulphur under the command of Captain Sir Edward Belcher during the years 1836-42. Volume II. Mollusca.

External links
 

occata
Gastropods described in 1843